William F. "Bill" Heimlich (September 28, 1911 - June 1, 1996) was an American intelligence officer and director of the RIAS (Rundfunk im amerikanischen Sektor, "Radio in the American Sector") after World War II.

Life and career
Heimlich, a native of Ohio, worked as a radio broadcaster during his time at Ohio State University, becoming a senior staff member of University Radio (WOSU) and receiving a national award for best radio documentary.

After receiving degrees in political science and European history, Heimlich was called to active duty in 1941 and served as an infantry officer in Europe, where he fought in the Battle of the Bulge. Later, he was with the first American troops to enter Berlin in 1945.

In Berlin, he was the assistant chief of staff for U.S. intelligence operations, before being appointed director of RIAS:Berlin by General Lucius D. Clay in early 1948, a position that he retained until 1949. Heimlich transferred to the Air Force in the mid-1950s, and completed his active duty as a colonel, retiring from the reserve in 1971.  In his military career, he was awarded the Bronze Star and the Army and Air Force Commendation medals, as well as awards from the French and Belgian governments.

Heimlich settled in the Washington, D.C. area in 1951, where he worked as an investigator and consultant for the Senate Foreign Relations Committee and other congressional committees.  During the Eisenhower administration, he was the public affairs director for the Office of Civil and Defense Mobilization.

Beginning in 1961, Heimlich was a vice president of the Association of National Advertisers, where he helped in establishing the National Council of Better Business Bureaus. He retired in 1976. After his retirement, Heimlich volunteered with what became the Arts Council of Fairfax County, becoming a board member, and its president in the mid-1970s.

The death of Adolf Hitler
On May 25, 1952, statements by Heimlich about the death of Adolf Hitler appeared in the tabloid magazine the National Police Gazette and, several days later, in Germany in the Darmstädter Tageblatt. Heimlich claimed that he had undertaken an investigation concerning the death of Hitler, and had found no proof of Hitler's death, only rumors. He claimed that the blood on the couch where Hitler shot himself was human blood, but the blood type was neither Hitler's or Eva Braun's. He further claimed that his investigators had thoroughly sifted through the dirt of the Reich Chancellery garden and found "no traces of any human bodies" and "no traces of any burning" of bodies. In fact, there is no record of American investigators being allowed by the Soviets to sift through the garden dirt in this fashion, with Germans doing the digging during the one day of investigation the Soviets allowed the other Allied powers to conduct. According to historian Anton Joachimsthaler, Heimlich's description of the process matches what the Russians themselves did, in the process finding Hitler's and Braun's dentures.  

Heimlich stated that his final report to Washington on his investigation found "no proof of Hitler's death in Berlin in 1945". Heimlich had made similar statements in his introduction to the 1947 book Who Killed Hitler, edited by Herbert Moore and James W. Barrett.  In it, Heimlich claimed that he was "unable to discover any evidence that [Hitler's] body had been burnt", and that he could not find any "eyewitnesses to Hitler's final days in the Chancellery." Heimlich went on to claim that he could not find "any reliable eyewitnesses for Hitler's activities after 22 Aprill 1945 – nine days before his alleged suicide..."

Personal life
In 1951, Heimlich married the German dancer and cabaret artist Christina Ohlsen, whom he met in Berlin in 1945.

Heimlich died of a stroke in 1996. His memories of his time in occupied Berlin and as director of the RIAS, as well as the beginning of his love affair with his future wife were published in 2000 in the book Heimlich im Kalten Krieg ("Secretly in the Cold War") by Tamara Donentat and his widow, with the help of Heimlich's notes.  After they settled in the United States, Ohlsen taught dance and was a founder and the director of the annual International Children's Festival at Wolf Trap National Park for the Performing Arts.

References
Notes

Further reading
Domentat, Tamara and Heimlich, Christina (2000) Heimlich im Kalten Krieg. Die Geschichte von Christina Ohlsen und Bill Heimlich ("Secretly in the Cold War: The Story of Christina Ohlsen and Bill Heimlich") Berlin: Aufbau Verlag,

External links
Heimlich, William F. (Oral History)

American broadcasters
American businesspeople
Death of Adolf Hitler
United States Army officers
United States Army personnel of World War II
United States Air Force colonels
United States Air Force reservists